Art crime may refer to:

 Art theft
 Art forgery
 Vandalism of art

Art crime